Kathleen Mavourneen is an 1837 Irish-themed song written by Annie Crawford and composed by Frederick Crouch.

Kathleen Mavourneen may also refer to:

Kathleen Mavourneen (play), play by Dion Boucicault
Kathleen Mavourneen (1913 film), silent short film by Herbert Brenon, based on the play
Kathleen Mavourneen (1906 film), silent film by Wallace McCutcheon Sr.
Kathleen Mavourneen (1919 film), silent film by Charles Brabin, starring Theda Bara, based on the play
Kathleen Mavourneen (1930 film), film by Albert Ray, based on the play
Kathleen Mavourneen (1937 film), film by Norman Lee, based on a novel by Clara Mulholland

See also
 Mavourneen, a 1915 play by Louis N. Parker